Antena 3 is a Spanish terrestrial television channel part of Atresmedia Televisión, of which it is the flagship station. Its current headquarters are located in San Sebastián de los Reyes.

Some of the most popular programmes broadcast by Antena 3 include Aquí no hay quien viva, Física o Química, El Barco, Los Protegidos, Los Simpson and El Internado. Some of its programmes, such as Física o Química, La casa de papel and Tu cara me suena gained international success and  recognition, leading to many duplicate programmes being produced worldwide.

Antena 3 is generally listed as the third channel on television sets throughout Spain, except certain autonomous communities where the regional station occupies channel number 3.

History 
It was launched on Christmas Day, 25 December 1989 when it began test transmissions, and then later, it commenced its official broadcasts throughout Spain exactly one month later on 25 January 1990 with a programme fronted by journalist Miguel Ángel Nieto, thus becoming Spain's first nationwide private television station.

Programming

The biggest winners for the channel are The Simpsons, Velvet, DEC, El Diario (a daily talk show run by Sandra Daviú) and the Noticias (particularly the evening edition run by Matías Prats).

Antena 3 dramas and sitcoms in the past and present include Manos a la obra, Canguros, La casa de los líos, Los lahkldrones van a la oficina, Hermanos de leche, Vecinos, Cañas y barro, Compañeros, Un paso adelante, Policías, Fuego, El pantano, Ada madrina, Dime que me quieres, Lleno por favor, ¿Quién da la vez?, Farmacia de Guardia, Menudo es mi padre, Nada es para siempre, Aquí no hay quien viva, and Los hombres de Paco.

Antena 3 Internacional
Antena 3 Internacional is a pay television channel owned by Atresmedia Internacional, with distribution handled by MVS Comunicaciones. The channel serves the Americas (including the United States, Mexico and Central America), the Caribbean and Europe. Antena 3 Internacional was founded in 1995. The channel retransmits programs from the domestic Antena 3 schedule and other programs from Atresmedia channels (LaSexta, Neox, Nova, Mega and Atreseries), along with live news programming, but due to rights issues with others who might hold rights to their shows in the Americas, some programming might air on a delay of several months or only after its original run has been completed.

Logos

Fake Gdim Izig photos scandal (Western Sahara)

Antena 3 was fined €215,000 by the Court of first instance of Brussels for repeatedly misusing fake photos of a homicide to illustrate what the channel presented as Moroccan police brutality at Gdim Izig (Laayoune) in Western Sahara. The pictures in fact showed bodies of victims of a quadruple homicide in Casablanca. The Rachidi family whose relatives' photos have been "repeatedly misused in bad faith" is still awaiting for "a public apology" from Antena 3.

See also
 Atresmedia
 RTL Group

References

External links
Official Site 

 
3
Television channels and stations established in 1988
Television channels and stations disestablished in 1988
Television channels and stations established in 1989
Television channels and stations established in 1990
RTL Group
1988 establishments in Spain
1988 disestablishments in Spain
1989 establishments in Spain
1990 establishments in Spain
Spanish-language television stations
Atresmedia channels